HMCS Cowichan (hull number MCB 147) was a  that served in the Royal Canadian Navy during the Cold War. The minesweeper entered service in 1953 and was transferred to the French Navy in 1954. Renamed La Malouine, the ship was converted to a territorial patrol vessel in 1973 and remained in service until 1977. La Malouine was sunk as a target ship in 1985.

Design and description
The Bay class were designed and ordered as replacements for the Second World War-era minesweepers that the Royal Canadian Navy operated at the time.

They had a complement of 38 officers and ratings.

The Bay-class minesweepers were powered by two GM 12-cylinder diesel engines driving two shafts creating . The ships were armed with one 40 mm Bofors gun and were equipped with minesweeping gear.

Operational history
The ship's keel was laid down on 20 June 1951 by Davie Shipbuilding at their yard in Lauzon, Quebec. Named for a bay located in British Columbia, Cowichan was launched on 12 November 1951. The ship was commissioned on 10 December 1953.

Cowichan remained in service for only a few months with the Royal Canadian Navy as the vessel was paid off on 31 March 1954. The minesweeper was transferred to the French Navy on 7 April 1954 and renamed La Malouine. She served as a minesweeper until 1973 when the minesweeping gear was removed and La Malouine transferred to the Pacific Ocean for duty as an overseas territories patrol vessel. La Malouine served until 1977. The ship was used as a target ship and sunk on 25 February 1985.

References

Notes

Citations

References
 
 
 
 
 

 

Bay-class minesweepers
Bay-class minesweepers of the French Navy
Ships built in Quebec
1951 ships
Cold War minesweepers of Canada
Cold War minesweepers of France
Minesweepers of the Royal Canadian Navy